Cobblestone Manor is a historic home located at Canandaigua in Ontario County, New York. It is a two-story cobblestone dwelling built in the 1830s in the Greek Revival style.  Early 20th century additions include a Colonial Revival style front porch with fluted Doric columns and a cornice decorated with modillions.

It was listed on the National Register of Historic Places in 1984.

References

Houses on the National Register of Historic Places in New York (state)
Cobblestone architecture
Houses completed in 1835
Houses in Ontario County, New York
National Register of Historic Places in Ontario County, New York